Phyllopentas is a genus of flowering plants belonging to the family Rubiaceae.

Its native range is Tropical Africa, Madagascar.

Species
Species:

Phyllopentas austro-orientalis 
Phyllopentas concinna 
Phyllopentas decaryana 
Phyllopentas elata 
Phyllopentas flava 
Phyllopentas hirtiflora 
Phyllopentas ionolaena 
Phyllopentas ledermannii 
Phyllopentas madagascariensis 
Phyllopentas mussaendoides 
Phyllopentas schimperi 
Phyllopentas schumanniana 
Phyllopentas tenuis 
Phyllopentas ulugurica

References

Rubiaceae
Rubiaceae genera
Taxa named by Birgitta Bremer
Taxa named by Bernard Verdcourt